The 2018–19 FIS Cross-Country World Cup Finals were the 11th edition of the FIS Cross-Country World Cup Finals, an annual cross-country skiing mini-tour event. The three-day event was held in Quebec City, Canada. It began on 22 March 2019 and concluded on 24 March 2019. It was the final competition round of the 2018–19 FIS Cross-Country World Cup.

Johannes Høsflot Klæbo of Norway and Stina Nilsson of Sweden won the two first stages of the mini-tour; a sprint freestyle and a mass start classic. Alex Harvey ended his skiing career with the fastest time on the third stage freestyle pursuit, which secured him both a World Cup race victory and the second place in the World Cup Final overall standings. Therese Johaug of Norway was the Winner of the Day among the women at the last day of the World Cup season. Johannes Høsflot Klæbo and Stina Nilsson won the overall standings by defending their leading positions on the third stage.

Overall leadership

The results in the overall standings were calculated by adding each rider's finishing times on each stage. On the sprint stage, the winners were awarded 30 bonus seconds. On the second stage, the three fastest skiers in finish were awarded 15, 10 and 5 bonus seconds, and the ten first skiers to pass the intermediate sprint points were also awarded bonus seconds. No bonus seconds were awarded on the third stage. The skier with the lowest cumulative time was the overall winner of the Cross-Country World Cup Finals.

A total of CHF 240,000, both genders included, was awarded in cash prizes in the race. The overall winners of the World Cup Finals received CHF 22,500, with the second and third placed skiers getting CHF 17,500 and CHF 11,000 respectively. All finishers in the top 20 were awarded money.  CHF 5,000 was given to the winners of each stage of the race, with smaller amounts given to places second and third.

Overall standings

Stages

Stage 1
22 March 2019
 The skiers qualification times count in the overall standings. Bonus seconds are awarded to the 30 skiers that qualifies for the quarter-finals, distributed as following:
 Final: 30–27–24–23–22–21
 Semi-final: 16–15–14–13–12–11
 Quarter-final: 5–5–5–4–4–4–4–4–3–3–3–3–3–2–2–2–2–2

Stage 2
23 March 2019
Bonus seconds:
 Men: 2 intermediate sprints, bonus seconds to the 10 first skiers (15–12–10–8–6–5–4–3–2–1) past the intermediate points.
 Women: 1 intermediate sprint, bonus seconds to the 10 first skiers (15–12–10–8–6–5–4–3–2–1) past the intermediate point.
 Bonus seconds in finish: 15–10–5 to the 3 first skiers crossing the finish line.

Stage 3
24 March 2019
The race for "Winner of the Day" counts for 2018–19 FIS Cross-Country World Cup points. No bonus seconds are awarded on this stage.

World Cup points distribution
The overall winners are awarded 200 points. The winners of each of the three stages are awarded 50 points. The maximum number of points an athlete can earn is therefore 350 points.

References

Sources
 

Finals
2019
2019 in cross-country skiing
2019 in Canadian sports
March 2019 sports events in Canada
Cross-country skiing competitions in Canada
2019 in Quebec
Sports competitions in Quebec City
2010s in Quebec City